Walter Lüchinger (born 26 February 1926 – 26 August 2021) was a Swiss rower. He competed at the 1952 Summer Olympics in Helsinki with the men's coxed pair where they were eliminated in the round one repêchage.

References

1926 births
2021 deaths 
Swiss male rowers
Olympic rowers of Switzerland
Rowers at the 1952 Summer Olympics
European Rowing Championships medalists